The 1991 NCAA Division II football season, part of college football in the United States organized by the National Collegiate Athletic Association at the Division II level, began in August 1991, and concluded with the NCAA Division II Football Championship on December 14, 1991, at Braly Municipal Stadium in Florence, Alabama, hosted by the University of North Alabama. The Pittsburg State Gorillas defeated the Jacksonville State Gamecocks, 23–6, to win their first Division II national title.

The Harlon Hill Trophy was awarded to Ronnie West, wide receiver from Pittsburg State.

Conference and program changes

Conference changes
One program departed Division II for Division I-AA prior to the season.

Program changes
After Central State University (Oklahoma) changed its name to the University of Central Oklahoma in 1991, the Central State Bronchos became the Central Oklahoma Bronchos.

Conference standings

Conference summaries

Postseason

The 1991 NCAA Division II Football Championship playoffs were the 19th single-elimination tournament to determine the national champion of men's NCAA Division II college football. The championship game was held at Braly Municipal Stadium in Florence, Alabama, for the sixth time.

Playoff bracket

See also
1991 NCAA Division I-A football season
1991 NCAA Division I-AA football season
1991 NCAA Division III football season
1991 NAIA Division I football season
1991 NAIA Division II football season

References